The Søren Kierkegaard Society (U.S.A.) is a philosophical society whose purpose is to promote the study of the philosophy and theology of Søren Kierkegaard in the United States. The society is affiliated with both the American Academy of Religion and the American Philosophical Association.

External links 
SKS website

Søren Kierkegaard
Philosophical societies in the United States